Froylán Turcios (July 7, 1875 – November 19, 1943) was a Honduran writer, journalist and politician. He is considered one of the most important Honduran intellectuals of the early 20th century.

Background and political roles
He was born in Juticalpa, Olancho. He was Minister of Interior, Member of the National Congress of Honduras and delegate to the League of Nations in Geneva.

He was private secretary of guerrilla Augusto César Sandino in Nicaragua, and a personal friend of Rubén Darío, Juan Ramón Molina and many other intellectuals and philosophers.

Writing activities
He directed the Tegucigalpa daily paper El Tiempo and founded the journals, El Pensamiento (1894), Revista Nueva (1902), Arte y Letras (1903) and Esfinge (1905), among others. In Guatemala he published the newspapers El Tiempo ( 1904),El Domingo (1908) and in Honduras El Heraldo (1909), El Nuevo Tiempo (1911), and Boletín de La Defensa Nacional (1924).

Violent themes
Turcios was especially against American involvement in Honduras, bitterly so. His literature tended to be violent stories, influenced by the Italian writer Gabriele D'Annunzio, with strong plots; indeed, in 'La Mejor Limosna' (The Best Act of Charity), from Cuentos del Amor y la Muerte (Stories of Love and Death) (1930), Turcios' narrator seemingly advocates 'mercy killings'.

Works
 Mariposas (1895)
 Renglones (1899)
 Hojas de Otoño (1905)
 Anabel Lee (1906)
 El Vampiro (1910)
 Tierra Materna (1911)
 El Fantasma Blanco (1911)
 Prosas nuevas (1914)
 Floresita sonora (1915)
 Cuentos del Amor y la Muerte (1930)
 Páginas del Ayer (1932)

Death
He died in San Jose, Costa Rica but was returned to Honduras and buried in Tegucigalpa.

References

2.Short film : La Risa de la Muerte (Laughter of Death), adaptation of his short story from Cuentos del Amor y de la Muerte 
(Tales of Love and death). Director Maria José Pinel, Honduras 2010

External links
 Short film: Laughter of Death (La Risa de la Muerte) http://vimeo.com/44779184

Honduran male writers
Honduran journalists
Male journalists
1875 births
1943 deaths
Government ministers of Honduras
Deputies of the National Congress of Honduras
Permanent Representatives of Honduras to the League of Nations
People from Olancho Department